After Darkness is a 1985 Swiss horror film directed by Dominique Othenin-Girard and Sergio Guerraz and starring John Hurt. It was entered into the 35th Berlin International Film Festival.

Cast
 John Hurt as Peter Hunningford
 Julian Sands as Laurence Hunningford
 Victoria Abril as Pascale
 Pamela Salem as Elisabeth
 Gerd Heinz as Care-taker
 Lise Ramu as Wife Care-taker
 William Jacques as Dr. Coles
 Jacqueline Moore as Mother Children
 Philippe Herzog as Laurence, Child
 Michael Herzog as Jan, Child
 Peter Kristen as Peter, Child
 Nirmalu López-Bravo as Medium
 Alexandra Cuypers as Sara
 Soledad Aizpurua as Interpreter
 Anne-Marie Delbart as Helen
 Jean-Pierre Gos as Engineer

References

External links

1985 films
English-language Swiss films
1985 horror films
Films directed by Dominique Othenin-Girard
Swiss horror films
1985 directorial debut films
1980s English-language films